The 1986 Davis Cup (also known as the 1986 Davis Cup by NEC for sponsorship purposes) was the 75th edition of the Davis Cup, the most important tournament between national teams in men's tennis. This year's tournament marked the introduction of the Africa Zone, which served as a qualifying sub-round for the Europe Zone. 71 teams would enter the competition, 16 in the World Group, 33 in the Europe Zone (including 9 in the Africa Zone), 13 in the Eastern Zone, and 9 in the Americas Zone. Bangladesh, Ivory Coast, Libya, Malta and Syria made their first appearances in the tournament.

Australia defeated the two-time defending champions Sweden in the final, held at the Kooyong Stadium in Melbourne, Australia, on 26–28 December, to win their 26th Davis Cup title.

World Group

Draw

Final
Australia vs. Sweden

Relegation play-offs

Date: 3–5 October

Americas Zone

  are promoted to the World Group in 1987.

Eastern Zone

  are promoted to the World Group in 1987.

Europe Zone

Africa Zone

  and  qualified to the Europe Zone main draws.

Europe Zone A

  are promoted to the World Group in 1987.

Europe Zone B

  are promoted to the World Group in 1987.

References
General

Specific

External links
Davis Cup Official Website

 
Davis Cups by year
Davis Cup
Davis Cup